Norbert Kállai (born 6 March 1984) is a retired Hungarian football player who currently plays for Békéscsaba 1912 Előre SE.

External links
 Profile

1984 births
Living people
People from Abony
Hungarian footballers
Association football defenders
Zalaegerszegi TE players
Kaposvölgye VSC footballers
Hévíz FC footballers
Diósgyőri VTK players
Békéscsaba 1912 Előre footballers
Sportspeople from Pest County